Brynteg may refer to:
 Brynteg, Anglesey, north-west Wales
 Brynteg, Wrexham, north-east Wales
 Ysgol Brynteg, a high school in Bridgend, south-east Wales